Hours of Work and Rest Periods (Road Transport) Convention, 1939 (shelved) is  an International Labour Organization Convention.

It was established in 1939, with the preamble stating:
Having decided upon the adoption of certain proposals with regard to the regulation of hours of work and rest periods of professional drivers (and their assistants) of vehicles engaged in road transport,...

Modification 

The concepts included in the convention were revised and included in ILO Convention C153, Hours of Work and Rest Periods (Road Transport) Convention, 1979.

Ratifications 
Prior to its shelving, the convention had been ratified by four states.

References

External links 
Text.
Ratifications.

Shelved International Labour Organization conventions
Road transport
Working time
Treaties concluded in 1939
Treaties entered into force in 1955